Francisco de Borja Téllez-Girón y Pimentel, 10th Duke de Osuna, Grandee of Spain (in full), (6 October 1785 – 21 May 1820), was a Spanish nobleman.

Francisco Téllez-Girón was the 7th son of Pedro Téllez-Girón, 9th Duke of Osuna (1756–1807) and was the 10th Duke of Osuna since 1807. He married in 1802, Countess Marie Françoise Philippine Beaufort-Spontin (1785–1830), daughter of Frederic Augustus Alexander, Duke of Beaufort-Spontin and his wife Leopoldina Álvarez de Toledo (1760–1792), who in turn was the daughter of Pedro de Alcántara Álvarez de Toledo y Silva, 12th Duke of the Infantado.
Their son the 11th Duke, Pedro de Álcantara was born in 1810, but died in 1844 without issue.

Sources

Francisco
Francisco
1785 births
1820 deaths
110
109
114
Knights of Calatrava
Grandees of Spain